Lawrence Yun is a Chief Economist and Senior Vice President of Research at the National Association of Realtors.

Early life 
Yun was born in Sunchon, South Pyongan Province, South Korea. While Yun was a child, his family moved to Columbia, South Carolina.

Education 
In 1987, Yun earned a bachelor of science degree in Mechanical Engineering from Purdue University. In 1995, Yun earned a PhD degree in economics from University of Maryland, College Park.

Career 
In 1999, Yun was an economic consultant to the U.S. Dept. of Veterans Affairs and U.S. Dept. of Education.

In 2000, Yun joined the National Association of Realtors (NAR) as a junior economist. In 2007, Yun became the chief economist and senior vice president of research at National Association of Realtors. Yun oversees the production of existing home sales statistics and the popular Home Buyer and Home Seller survey reports. He regularly appears on CNBC, BBC, Bloomberg Television, and is often quoted in the media. As was his predecessor David Lereah at the NAR, Yun has been criticized for his overly optimistic predictions on the housing market. 

Yun is also a frequent speaker at Real Estate conferences throughout the United States. In March 2008, USA Today listed him among the top 10 economic forecasters in the country.  At the time, when most economists were calling for another major declines in the housing market, Yun predicted that the housing market could stabilize with home buyer tax credit.  Four years later, that rebound has yet to materialize according to some analysts, though actual data show home sales, housing starts, and Case-Shiller home prices either showing modest increases from 2009 or showing essentially no meaningful change.

Yun appears regularly on financial news outlets, is a frequent speaker at real estate conferences throughout the United States. Yun appears often as a guest on CSPAN’s Washington Journal and is a regular guest columnist on the Forbes online.

In March 2012, Yun testified as a chief economist before Congress' sub-committee hearing.

While a research associate at the University of Maryland from 1995 to 1998 with the funding from the United States Agency for International Development, Yun helped develop a graduate economics curriculum and lectured at several universities in the former Soviet Union as that country transitioned from communism to a market-based economy.

Personal life 
Yun's wife is Alla. They have one son. Yun resides in Arlington, Virginia.

See also 
 Dennis Mueller
 Mancur Olson

References

External links 
 
 Lawrence Yun at National Association of Realtors
 Source of the Week: Lawrence Yun at NPR
 Lawrence Yun referenced at thehill.com
 Lawrence Yun on The Real Estate Hour radio shows at Wharton Business Radio
 2012 Lawrence Yun at Charleston Trident Association
 2012 Charleston Trident Association summary of Yun's speech by Jim Parker
 2016 Keynote speech at the Greater Lehigh Valley Realtors Association' annual Economic Outlook

21st-century American economists
Living people
Purdue University College of Engineering alumni
South Korean people
University of Maryland, College Park alumni
Year of birth missing (living people)